"The X-Files" is an instrumental written and produced by American film and television composer Mark Snow. On its parent album, The Truth and the Light: Music from the X-Files, the track is titled "Materia Primoris". It is a remixed version of the original theme Snow composed for the science fiction television series The X-Files in 1993. The composition was released as a single in 1996 and achieved chart success, particularly in France, where it reached number one on the SNEP Singles Chart. The composition has since been covered by many artists, including DJ Dado and Triple X; DJ Dado's version was a major hit in Europe while Triple X's version reached number two in Australia.

Song information
"The X-Files" typically used more instrumental music than most hour-long dramas. According to the "Behind the Truth" segment on the Season 1 DVD, Mark Snow created the echo effect on his famous X-Files theme song by accident. Snow said that he had gone through several revisions, but Chris Carter felt that something was not quite right. Carter walked out of the room and Snow put his hand and forearm on his keyboard in frustration. Snow said, "this sound was in the keyboard. And that was it."

The whistle melody comes from an old sample from the Proteus line of synth products called "Whistling Joe" and the whistling of Snow's wife, Glynn.

Chart performance
The single debuted at number two on the UK Singles Chart on March 30, 1996, and stayed there for three weeks. In France, the single entered the chart at number 42 on April 6, 1996, and climbed to number two four weeks later. It remained for five weeks at this position, behind Robert Miles's hit "Children", then topped the chart for a sole week, becoming the second instrumental number-one hit on the French charts. It totaled 12 weeks in the top ten and 30 weeks in the top 50. The single re-charted in October 1998, but remained in the lower positions.

Track listings

UK CD and 12-inch single; European CD single
 "The X-Files" (original version) – 3:25
 "The X-Files" (Terrestrial mix) – 4:20
 "The X-Files" (P.M. Dawn remix) – 3:59

UK cassette single
 "The X-Files" (original version) – 3:25
 "The X-Files" (Terrestrial mix) – 4:20

German maxi-CD single
 "The X-Files" (main theme) – 3:25
 "The X-Files" (DJ Delicious remix) – 5:19
 "The X-Files" (Ravers Nature remix) – 6:02

German 12-inch single
A1. "The X-Files" (DJ Delicious remix) – 5:19
B1. "The X-Files" (Ravers Nature remix) – 6:02
B2. "The X-Files" (main theme) – 3:25

French CD and 12-inch single (remixes)
 "The X-Files" (Secret Sessions extended mix) – 6:22
 "The X-Files" (Secret Sessions radio edit) – 4:19
 "The X-Files" (Map Mystery mix) – 5:27
 "The X-Files" (Terrestrial mix) – 4:20

Australian CD single
 "The X-Files" (main title)
 "The X-Files" (Flexifinger Terrestrial mix)
 "The X-Files" (P.M. Dawn remix)

Japanese mini-CD single
 "The X-Files"
 "The X-Files" (P.M. Dawn remix)

Credits
 Composed by Mark Snow
 Terrestrial mix: remixed and produced Flexifinger
 P.M. Dawn remix: guitar by Cameron Greider, remixed by P.M. Dawn, synthesizers by Henry Hay and Maurice Luke, recorded and mixed by Michael Fossenkemper
 Ravers nature remix: produced and remixed by John Bogota, Pedro Ferrari and Roy Ströbel
 Secret Session remixes: produced by Special Agents for MAP Productions, engineered and mixed by RoBo
 Map Mystery mix: produced and mixed by Moorcroft and Prins for MAP Productions, engineered and programmed by TK for MAP Productions

Charts

Weekly charts

Year-end charts

Certifications and sales

DJ Dado version

At the same time Snow's original version was experiencing chart success, Italian producer DJ Dado covered the song. His version became a top-10 hit in several countries, reaching number one in Denmark, though it failed to reach the top 10 in France and Germany. In the US, this version was featured on the Pure Moods compilation album 1997 re-release.

Track listings
CD single
 "X-Files" (DJ Dado paranormal activity mix) – 6:38
 "X-Files" (Claudio Diva sub-dream activity mix) – 8:40

CD maxi
 "X-Files" (radio edit) – 3:57
 "X-Files" (DJ Dado paranormal activity mix) – 6:42
 "X-Files" (Claudio Diva sub-dream paranormal activity mix) – 8:44

CD maxi
 "X-Files" (radio edit) – 3:57
 "X-Files" (DJ Dado paranormal activity mix) – 6:41
 "X-Files" (Tom Wilson Dyme mix) – 6:38
 "X-Files" (dV8 deviant mix) – 6:29
 "X-Files" (freak bros area 51 mix) – 6:53
 "X-Files" (Claudio Diva sub-dream paranormal activity mix) – 8:44

12-inch maxi
 "X-Files" (DJ Dado paranormal activity mix) – 6:42
 "X-Files" (Claudio Diva sub-dream paranormal activity mix) – 8:44

CD maxi – remixes
 "X-Files" (2 Cowboys remix) – 5:07
 "X-Files" (Reygroove remix) – 5:02
 "X-Files" (Valez & L. Antolini remix) – 6:25
 "X-Files" (Alex Voghi remix) – 6:25
 "X-Files" (Miki B. remix – flute experience part I) – 8:38
 "X-Files" (Moroldo & Mensi mix) – 4:35
 "X-Files" (Hornbostel & M. Marvin remix) – 5:18
 "X-Files" (Fabio Locati remix) – 6:18

Charts

Weekly charts

Year-end charts

Triple X version
The song was also covered by Triple X. This cover was less successful than the original version or DJ Dado's cover, but it did reach number two in Australia and was certified Gold by the Australian Recording Industry Association.

Charts

Weekly charts

Year-end charts

Certifications

The X-Club version

A version by the X-Club was released in Australasia in 1996.

Charts

The X-Files movie single and Mike Oldfield version

"The X-Files Theme" was released as a Japan only EP in 1998 from the soundtrack album The X-Files: The Album for The X-Files movie.

The maxi-CD includes four remixes of Mark Snow's theme to the television series, The X-Files. Notably "Tubular X" is part Snow's theme and consists of parts of Mike Oldfield's Tubular Bells. Another track from Oldfield also appears, "The Source of Secrets", the opening piece from his Tubular Bells III album, which also based upon the same theme from the original Tubular Bells.

Track listing
 "Tubular X" – Mike Oldfield – 3:53
 "The X-Files Theme" – The Dust Brothers – 3:27
 "The X-Files Theme" – Satoshi Tomiie radio edit – 4:17 
 "The X-Files Theme" – R.H. Factor Pop radio edit – 3:37
 "The Source of Secrets" – Mike Oldfield – 5:33

References

1990s instrumentals
1993 compositions
1993 songs
1996 singles
1998 singles
DJ Dado songs
Mark Snow songs
Tubular X
Number-one singles in Denmark
Number-one singles in Scotland
SNEP Top Singles number-one singles
Songs written by Mike Oldfield
Television drama theme songs
The X-Files music